Florence: Days of Destruction (Italian: Per Firenze) is a 1966 documentary about the 1966 Flood of the Arno River and its catastrophic effect on the city of Florence. Directed by Franco Zeffirelli, it is Zeffirelli's only documentary, and features the only known film footage of the flood. The film is 50 minutes long, and was produced by RAI. Released less than a month after the disaster, the film reputedly raised more than $20 million for the reconstruction efforts.

The film was narrated in English and Italian by actor Richard Burton, who had been making The Taming of the Shrew with Zeffirelli at the time.

Variety described the film as a "magnificent, frightening document".

See also
1966 Flood of the Arno River

External links 

 The whole documentary on RaiPlay.

References

1966 documentary films
Films directed by Franco Zeffirelli
Films set in Florence
Documentary films about Italy
Films scored by Ennio Morricone
Documentary films about disasters
1966 in Italian television